Daniel Joseph Daly (November 11, 1873 – April 27, 1937) was a United States Marine and one of nineteen U.S. servicemen to have been awarded the Medal of Honor twice. He earned his first Medal of Honor during the Boxer Rebellion in 1900, and the second in Haiti in 1915. Daly and Major General Smedley Butler are the only Marines who earned two Medals of Honor in two separate actions.

In World War I, Daly became further entrenched in Marine Corps lore when he is said to have yelled, "Come on, you sons of bitches, do you want to live forever?" to his company before charging the Germans at the Battle of Belleau Wood. Butler described Daly as "the fightingest Marine I ever knew...It was an object lesson to have served with him."

Daly's Medals of Honor are on display at the National Museum of the Marine Corps in Triangle, Virginia, which also features the "live forever" quote etched in the stone of the building's rotunda.

Early life

Daniel Joseph Daly was born on November 11, 1873, in Glen Cove, New York, on Long Island. He spent his youth in New York City, working as a newsboy among other  jobs. Despite his slight build— tall and weighing —Daly occasionally fought as a semi-pro boxer.

Military career

Early career
Daly enlisted in the United States Marine Corps on January 10, 1899, at the age of 25. His first posting was with the Asiatic Fleet aboard the cruiser USS Newark. In 1900, the fleet arrived in China during the Boxer Rebellion. On July 15, 1900, Private Daly and his commanding officer, Captain Newt H. Hall, set out to reconnoiter a position while under siege by the Boxers. A working party, scheduled to follow to construct defenses, never arrived. While Captain Hall returned for the working party, Daly single-handedly fought off a furious Boxer attack on the position, an action which earned him his first Medal of Honor.

After serving in China, Daly saw duty on various ships in the Pacific and Caribbean areas, and saw action in the Philippines and the Banana Wars.  He also trained recruits, gained a reputation as an excellent boxer, and rose to the rank of gunnery sergeant. On March 14, 1911, Daly was aboard the USS Springfield when he spotted a gasoline fire that was spreading toward the ship's magazine. He successfully extinguished the fire, ensuring the safety of the ship's 500 crewmen, but spent several weeks hospitalized with severe burns. Daly received commendations from both the Secretary of the Navy and the Commandant of the Marine Corps for his actions.

Daly earned his second Medal of Honor in Haiti with the U.S. Marines supporting the Haitian government in a fight against Cacos insurgents. On the night of October 24, 1915, during the Battle of Fort Dipitie, Gunnery Sergeant Daly was on patrol with a detachment of three squads of the 15th Company, 2nd Marine Regiment, under the command of Major Smedley Butler. The Marines were ambushed by a force of some 400 Cacos while crossing a river, and the horse carrying their machine gun was killed, its carcass sinking to the riverbed. Later, rearmed and with Daly in command of one of the squads, the Marines regrouped and scattered the Cacos.

World War I

Daly's service in World War I began November 4, 1917, initially fighting in Toulon and Aisne. During the Battle of Belleau Wood in June 1918, Daly served as the first sergeant of 73rd Company, 6th Marine Regiment, 4th Marine Brigade, attached to the U.S. Army's 2nd Infantry Division. On June 1, the regiment was placed in a gap in the line left by the French 43rd Division, with the intent to stop the German advance toward Paris. The Marines drove back an attack by the German 28th Division on June 2. On June 5, a German shell landed in an ammunition dump at Lucy-le-Bocage, starting a fire. Daly quickly led a party from his company into the flames to extinguish the blaze, preventing the arsenal from exploding.

On June 6, the Marines went on the offensive. Facing 1,200 Germans with 200 machine guns, the 73rd Company was pinned down by intense fire. As the Marines took cover at nightfall, Daly walked openly to each of his machine gun positions, rallying and coordinating his men. On June 10, a German machine gun unit advanced close to Daly's position. Daly immediately charged the weapon, destroying it with three grenades, shot the unit's commanding officer with his .45 caliber pistol, and took its remaining 14 soldiers prisoner. As the battle raged later in the day, Daly exposed himself to enemy fire while evacuating the wounded. For his actions from June 5–10, Daly was awarded the Navy Cross, the Distinguished Service Cross, and the French Médaille militaire.

Daly's final campaign was the Meuse–Argonne offensive. By the war's end, he had suffered a bullet wound in the shoulder and two shrapnel wounds in the leg. Daly left active duty for the United States Marine Corps Reserve in 1919, and officially retired on February 6, 1929 at the rank of sergeant major.

Legacy
According to Marine Corps lore, Daly rallied his men at the Battle of Belleau Wood by yelling, "Come on, you sons-o'-bitches, do you want to live forever?" This quote first appeared in And They Thought We Wouldn't Fight, a 1918 memoir by war correspondent Floyd Gibbons of The Chicago Tribune. Gibbons, who was attached to Major Benjamin Berry's 3rd Battalion, 5th Marine Regiment, attributed the line to an unnamed gunnery sergeant in that unit. Popular legend eventually credited Daly with the rallying cry, despite discrepancies in the story—Daly was a first sergeant, not a gunnery sergeant, and he was a member of the 6th Marine Regiment, not the 5th. Historian Alan Axelrod stated that "nobody has been found who actually heard [Daly] say it." Regardless, in May 1919, less than a year after the battle, Daly's story at Belleau Wood—incorporating the quote—was featured in "The Wood of Fair Water," one of six short films in The Rothapfel Unit Program, a motion picture directed by Samuel L. Rothapfel.

For his part, Daly told a Marine Corps historian that he yelled, "For Christ's sake, men—come on! Do you want to live forever?" Irrespective of the quote's wording or who spoke it, it has become firmly entrenched in Marine Corps lore, with Axelrod noting that the details do not "diminish the reality the legend is based on."

Later life

After leaving the Marines, Daly lived a quiet life with his sister in New York, working as a bank guard and avoiding publicity. He died of a heart attack in Glendale, Queens, New York on April 27, 1937, aged 63. He is buried at Cypress Hills National Cemetery in Brooklyn, New York.

Decorations and honors

Honors
A   was named in honor of Daly and was commissioned on March 10, 1943.

On November 10, 2005, the United States Postal Service issued its Distinguished Marines stamps in which Daly was honored, along with three other Marine Corps heroes. Besides Daly, these stamps honored John Basilone, John A. Lejeune, and Chesty Puller.

Medals
Daly's decorations and medals includes two Medals of Honor; the Navy Cross; Distinguished Service Cross; three Letters of Commendation; Good Conduct Medal with two bronze stars; China Relief Expedition Medal; Philippine Campaign Medal; Expeditionary Medal with one bronze star; Mexican Service Medal; Haitian Campaign Medal; World War I Victory Medal with Aisne, St. Mihiel, Meuse-Argonne, and Defensive-Sector clasps and Citation Star; Médaille militaire; Croix de Guerre with Palm; and the Fourragère. The last three awards are from the French government. Only the Croix de Guerre is authorized for wear by U.S. personnel. A special exception is made for Marines assigned to the 5th and 6th Marine Regiments; they are permitted to wear the Fourragère with their service and dress coats or jackets.

Medal of Honor

First award: 1901
Awarded for actions during the China Relief

General Orders: War Department, General Orders No. 55 (July 19, 1901)

Action Date: August 14, 1900

Service: Marine Corps

Rank: Private

Battalion: Captain Newt Hall's Marine Detachment

Regiment: 1st Regiment (Marines)

Citation:

Second award: 1915
Awarded for actions during the U.S. Invasion and Occupation of Haiti

Action Date: October 24, 1915

Service: Marine Corps

Rank: Gunnery Sergeant

Company: 15th Company (Mounted)

Regiment: 2d Marines

Citation:

Distinguished Service Cross
Awarded for actions during the World War I

General Orders: War Department, General Orders No. 101 (1918)

Action Date: June 5, 7, & 10, 1918

Service: Marine Corps

Rank: First Sergeant

Company: 73d Company

Regiment: 6th Regiment (Marines)

Division: 2d Division, American Expeditionary Forces

Citation:

Navy Cross
Awarded for actions during the World War I

Action Date: June 5, 7, & 10, 1918

Service: Marine Corps

Rank: First Sergeant

Company: 73d Company

Regiment: 6th Regiment (Marines)

Division: 2d Division, American Expeditionary Forces

Citation:

Citation Star
In 1932 the Silver Citation Star became the Silver Star, a full sized decoration.  All personnel awarded the Silver Citation Star were authorized to wear the Silver Star, the USA's third highest decoration for heroism in combat.

Awarded for actions during the World War I

General Orders: Citation Orders, 2d Division, American Expeditionary Forces

Action Date: June 6–July 10, 1918

Service: Marine Corps

Rank: First Sergeant

Company: Machine Gun Company

Regiment: 6th Regiment (Marines)

Division: 2d Division, American Expeditionary Forces

Citation:

See also
 List of Medal of Honor recipients
 List of historic United States Marines
 List of Medal of Honor recipients for the Boxer Rebellion

References

Citations

Bibliography

Notes

1873 births
1937 deaths
United States Marine Corps personnel of World War I
Burials at Cypress Hills National Cemetery
United States Marine Corps Medal of Honor recipients
Recipients of the Croix de Guerre 1914–1918 (France)
Recipients of the Distinguished Service Cross (United States)
Recipients of the Navy Cross (United States)
Recipients of the Silver Star
United States Marines
American military personnel of the Boxer Rebellion
People from Glen Cove, New York
Military personnel from New York (state)
Boxer Rebellion recipients of the Medal of Honor
Occupation of Haiti recipients of the Medal of Honor
Double Recipients of the Medal of Honor